The Crystal Hills are a low mountain range in the Mojave Desert, in extreme southwestern section of Death Valley National Park, California.

The small range is located in northern San Bernardino County.

The dominant Panamint Range lies to the north of the Crystal Hills.

References 

Mountain ranges of the Mojave Desert
Death Valley National Park
Mountain ranges of San Bernardino County, California
Mountain ranges of Southern California